Lusaka District is a district of Zambia, located in Lusaka Province. The capital lies at Lusaka. As of the 2000 Zambian Census, the district had a population of 1,084,703 people.

Constituencies 
Lusaka District is divided into seven constituencies, namely Lusaka Central, Matero, Mandevu, Munali, Chawama, Kabwata and Kanyama.

References

Districts of Lusaka Province